Allie Moss is an American songwriter and guitarist from Jersey Shore. She released her own EP entitled Passerby in 2009. In 2011, Moss released her debut album Late Bloomer. She regularly performs as a guitarist and backup vocalist for singer/songwriter and friend Ingrid Michaelson. While not performing on Michaelson's 2010 European tour, Moss returned to the fold during the summer of 2010 for a US tour.

Moss is probably best known in the UK for her song "Corner" which has been used for a television commercial for BT Infinity, its broadband internet service. The single reached number 70 in the UK.

Her song "Something to Hold Onto" was featured on the TV show Bones episode "The Feet on the Beach". Her song "Corner" was featured on Pretty Little Liars episode "It's Alive" and on episode 4.01 of the NBC series Parenthood "Family Portrait".

Collaborations 
In 2016 she released an EP featuring 3-part harmonies with Bess Rogers and Hannah Winkler titled Allie, Bess & Hannah Sing.

Discography
Passerby EP (2009)Christmas Tidings Holiday EP (2011)Late Bloomer (2011)The Other Side EP (2016)

Singles

Collaborations 
Allie, Bess, & Hannah Sing EP (2016)

Compilations

References

External links

Year of birth missing (living people)
Living people
American women singer-songwriters
Singer-songwriters from New Jersey
21st-century American women